Matthew Clark Duff (born October 6, 1974) is a former Major League Baseball pitcher and hunter.

Duff grew up in Alligator, Mississippi. He appeared in seven games for the St. Louis Cardinals in 2002. He now runs a bowhunting business and appears in such shows as Buck Commander and Major League Bowhunter, which he owns and co-hosts. Duff is also the co-host of the Friends of NRA TV show alongside ex-wife and worldwide women's shooting champion Jessie Duff.

References

External links
Baseball-Reference.com page
Major League Bowhunter
Major League Bowhunter on CarbonTV
Sportsman Channel
  NRA Blog
Friends of NRA TV
Outdoor Channel

1974 births
Living people
Sportspeople from Clarksdale, Mississippi
Baseball players from Mississippi
St. Louis Cardinals players
Major League Baseball pitchers
St. Paul Saints players
Sioux Falls Canaries players
Springfield Capitals players
San Angelo Colts players
Alexandria Aces players
Ole Miss Rebels baseball players
Augusta GreenJackets players
Lynchburg Hillcats players
Altoona Curve players
New Haven Ravens players
Potomac Cannons players
Memphis Redbirds players
Pawtucket Red Sox players
Syracuse SkyChiefs players
Dunedin Blue Jays players
Mississippi Delta Trojans baseball players
People from Bolivar County, Mississippi